Hadi Gavaber (also Romanized as Hādī Gavāber; also known as Hādī Gavāpar) is a village in Machian Rural District, Kelachay District, Rudsar County, Gilan Province, Iran. At the 2006 census, its population was 153, in 38 families.

References 

Populated places in Rudsar County